Music For Strippers, Hookers, and The Odd On-Looker is the sixth studio album by Kristeen Young. It was produced by Tony Visconti primarily in Los Angeles between March and April 2008.

Track listing
"Son Of Man" – 2:38
"The Depression Contest" – 3:35
"Stop Thinking" – 3:13
"Everybody Wants Me To Cry" – 4:00
"You Must Love Me" – 2:57
"That's What It Takes, Dear (featuring Patrick Stump)" – 3:59
"I Won't Be Home For Christmas" – 2:37
"Comfort Is Never A Goal" – 3:54
"He's Sickened By My Crude Emotion" – 3:45
"Lily Sincere" – 1:07
"Keyboard Like A Gun" – 3:04
"If You Marry Him" – 2:31
"Protestant" – 6:15
"Halfway Across The Atlantic Ocean" – 4:07

Singles

Musicians
Kristeen Young: Vocals, keyboard
"Baby" Jeff White: Drums
Patrick Stump (guest vocalist on "That's What It Takes, Dear")

References

External links
 http://kristeenyoung.com/

Kristeen Young albums
2009 albums
Albums produced by Tony Visconti